Paralpenus wintgensi is a moth of the family Erebidae. It was described by Strand in 1909. It is found in Burundi, the Democratic Republic of Congo, Eritrea, Rwanda, Tanzania and Zimbabwe.

Subspecies
Paralpenus wintgensi wintgensi
Paralpenus wintgensi zimbabweiensis Dubatolov, 2011 (Zimbabwe)

References

Spilosomina
Moths described in 1909